Tattenhoe and Tattenhoe Park are adjacent neighbourhoods of Milton Keynes, England, in the ancient ecclesiastic parish of Tattenhoe.  They are located at the south-western edge of the city, next to Whaddon in Aylesbury Vale, not far from  the ruins of Snelshall Priory.

History
The name is an Old English language word meaning "Tatta's hill-spur". The village was first recorded (in the 12th century) as 'Thateo'; the village has also been known as Tattenho, Totenho (13th century); Tottynho (16th-17th century); Tattenhall (18th-19th century)

The village was abandoned in the 16th century and had its own moated manor house and church (1540, perhaps 12th century).  By the time redevelopment began, it consisted of just three farms and St. Giles's Church, but was recognised as a village (rather than a hamlet) because it had its own ecclesiastical parish.

Sports facilities

The districts have the Tattenhoe Sports Pavilion. The pavilion has legacy and astroturf playing fields, a meeting room and free parking on site.

Howe Park Wood

It is one of England's few remaining primeval woodlands (though certainly coppiced) and home to a wide variety of wildlife, notably Odonata.

Civil parish and city C=council ward
Tattenhoe is in the modern civil parish of Shenley Brook End and gives its name to a ward of Milton Keynes City Council. , the Local Councillors for the Tattenhoe Ward are Cllr James Lancaster (Con), Cllr Manish Verma (Con) and Cllr Shazna Muzammil (Con).

References

Areas of Milton Keynes